Lucinida (formerly Lucinoida) is a taxonomic order of saltwater clams, marine bivalve molluscs.

Families 
In 2010, a new proposed classification system for the Bivalvia was published in by Bieler, Carter & Coan, revising the classification of the Bivalvia. Lucinoida (now Lucinida) thus became an order of its own. It includes the following two superfamilies:
Superfamily: Lucinoidea
Family: Lucinidae
 Family: †Mactromyidae
 Family: †Paracyclidae
Superfamily: Thyasiroidea
Family: Thyasiridae

References

 
Bivalve orders